F' (F + apostrophe) may stand in for:
 Fʼ (F + modifier apostrophe), which represents:
 the labiodental ejective fricative, in the International Phonetic Alphabet
 palatalised f, in Slavic notation
 F′ (F + prime), often used in mathematical notation for the first derivative of a function
 F̀ (F + grave accent), used for transliterating the Cyrillic letter Fita
 Fʻ (F + ʻokina)
 Fʾ (F + right half ring)
 Fʿ (F + left half ring)